John Corneby Wilson Austin (February 13, 1870 – September 3, 1963) was an architect and civic leader who participated in the design of several landmark buildings in Southern California, including the Griffith Observatory, Los Angeles City Hall, and the Shrine Auditorium.

Life
Born in Bodicote, Oxfordshire, England, Austin was an apprentice to architect Williams S. Barwick in the late 1880s.  He moved to the United States and worked as a draftsman for architect Benjamin Linfoot of Philadelphia from 1891–1892, before relocating to San Francisco where he was a draftsman at Mooser and Devlin from 1892-1895. He moved to Los Angeles in 1895, and became one of the city's leading architects.

Austin was also active in civic affairs in Los Angeles.  He was elected President of the Los Angeles Chamber of Commerce in January 1930.  As head of the Chamber of Commerce, Austin initiated a public-art campaign to beautify the city through the erection of statuary and monuments.  One of the issues on which Austin became a leader was the need to develop a larger water system for Los Angeles.  He spoke publicly and was an advocate in the business community in favor of a 1930 bond issue to raise $38.8 million to develop the city's water supply.

As the Great Depression deepened in Los Angeles, Austin also advocated federal spending as a means to stimulate the economy.  In April 1930, a letter from Austin to President Herbert Hoover was published in the Los Angeles Times.  In it, Austin proposed the creation of an emergency fund, raised by taxation or appropriation, which could be used to develop public improvements and to provide needed employment.  Austin argued that such programs were needed so that otherwise good citizens not fall "prey to the propaganda of Communists and agitators against our institutions."  In January 1931, after expressing concern that "we are just drifting along in this matter," Austin traveled to Washington, D.C. to press for federal construction projects in Los Angeles.  Austin announced that he was going east "with a crowbar to try and pry something loose," vowing to stay as long as he felt he could help get things started.  Later that year, President Hoover appointed Austin to coordinate the federal government's unemployment relief efforts in ten Southern California counties.  Shortly after his appointment to the relief effort, however, Austin's wife of 29 years, Hilda Violet Austin, the mother of nine children with Austin, died at their home in Pasadena.

Austin also served as the President of the State Board of Architectural Examiners, a member of the National Labor Board responsible for labor disputes in Southern California, President of the Southern California Historical Society, President of the Jonathan Club, and a 32nd degree Mason.  In 1949, the Los Angeles Chamber of Commerce presented Austin with its first ever Achievement Award.  In 1963, Los Angeles Mayor Samuel Yorty presented Austin with a scroll commending him "for serving in an outstanding manner as a distinguished architect."

Austin died in 1963 at his home in Pasadena, California.

Work

Austin's work as an architect includes:

With Frederic Morse Ashley (1870-1960)
 Alexander Hamilton High School, Los Angeles, 1931. The Administration Building at Hamilton High School was designed by architects John C. Austin and Frederick C. Ashley in the Northern Italian Renaissance style. Multicolored and patterned brickwork, elaborate cast stone decoration, and a bell tower clad in verdigris copper distinguish the building. Austin & Ashley designed Waidelich Hall which opened on April 20, 1937. On February 21, 1989, the auditorium was renamed Norman J. Pattiz Concert Hall.
 Griffith Observatory, Griffith Park, 1933–1935
 California State Building (Los Angeles), northwest corner of First from Spring to Broadway, Civic Center, Los Angeles (completed 1931, opened 1932, abandoned 1990s, demolished 1976). The lot is currently vacant.

Other works
 The Beckett Mansion, Los Angeles former Residence built in 1905 for the Dr. Wesley Wilbur Beckett family
 Higgins/Verbeck/Hirsch Mansion, Los Angeles (1902) private residence that has been used as a filming location for many films and television shows
 Fremont Hotel, Los Angeles (1902), 100 room hotel
 Potter Hotel, a five-story, 600-room resort hotel, Santa Barbara, California, 1902–1903 (burned 1921)
 Virginia Hotel, Long Beach, California, 1907, razed circa 1935
 The Carnegie Library in Anaheim, 1909, now the home of the Anaheim Museum.
 Hollywood Masonic Temple, Hollywood Boulevard, directly across the street from Grauman's Chinese Theatre, 1921, added to the National Register of Historic Places in 1985
 Guaranty Building, Hollywood, 1923
 Shrine Auditorium, Los Angeles, the headquarters of the Al Malaikah Temple, a division of the Shriners, 1925–1926. When opened, the Los Angeles Times called it a "Triumph of Art" and credited the Moorish style architecture to Austin as the man "who drew plans and specifications for the group of magnificent structures." The Academy Awards have been held at the Shrine on ten occasions. It was added to the National Register of Historic Places in 1987.
 Los Angeles City Hall, 1928. Along with John Parkinson and Albert C. Martin, Sr., Martin was hired to design what has become the most recognized building in Los Angeles. The selection of an architect for the city hall led to fierce competition among the city's leading architects. The City Council selected the firm of Curlett and Beelman, but the Board of Public Works chose Martin, Parkinson, and Austin. Controversy continued when the architects turned in drawings for 28-story tower to house a municipal government that could adequately fit into the first four floors. The city ultimately accepted the tower plan, and in March 1928 the Board of Public Works passed a resolution commending the architects "for the eminently satisfactory and beautiful design of the monumental building."
 Monrovia High School, Monrovia, California, 1928
 Arroyo Seco Bank Building, Los Angeles, 1926
 Memorial Branch Library, Los Angeles, 1930. This Gothic Revival library building includes a large heraldic work of stained glass created by artists at Judson Studios. The building was dedicated to the memory of Los Angeles high school students who died in World War I.  Added to the National Register of Historic Places in 1987.
 NBC Radio City Studios, Hollywood and Vine, 1938–1939 (razed)
 St. Vincent Medical Center (Los Angeles) St. Vincent's Hospital
 Los Angeles Hall of Justice – While with Allied Architects, Austin also worked on the Hall of Justice building. It is the oldest building in the Los Angeles Civic Center and was the site of the trials of Charles Manson and Sirhan Sirhan. It has been vacant since 1994.
 St. Paul's Catholic Church.
 The first State Building in the Los Angeles Civic Center.
 Los Angeles High School (3rd location), 4650 Olympic Blvd, Los Angeles, 1917–1971 (razed)

References

1870 births
1963 deaths
Architects from Los Angeles
English emigrants to the United States
Architects from Oxfordshire
People from Bodicote